Lyddington is a village in the county of Rutland in the East Midlands of England. The population of the civil parish was 397 at the 2001 census, and had fallen to 366 at the 2011 census.

The village's name origin is uncertain. Perhaps, 'farm/settlement of Hlyda' or 'farm/settlement with a noisy stream'.

Lyddington Bede House, owned by English Heritage, is a Grade I listed building incorporating parts of a medieval bishop's palace. In 1547 it was seized on behalf of the king from the Bishops of Lincoln and later passed to Lord Burghley. In 1600 part of the palace was converted into an almshouse and it continued in this use until 1930. The remains of the fishponds of the bishop's palace are nearby.

St Andrew's Church is also Grade I listed.

There are two public houses, The Marquess of Exeter and The Old White Hart.

Broadband connection
Residents of Lyddington raised £37,000 to offer 200 homes the super-fast broadband that BT could not deliver. The broadband connection was upgraded by Rutland Telecom using a technique called sub-loop unbundling and residents can now achieve broadband speeds of up to 25Mbit/s.
This was the first time in the UK that Fibre to the Cabinet technology had been used in a rural village.

References

External links

Villages in Rutland
Civil parishes in Rutland